Tour 2000 is the third live album and film by German rock band Böhse Onkelz. It was recorded at the "Tour 2000" at Festhalle Frankfurt, Westfalenhalle Dortmund, and Waldbühne Berlin.

Track listing

VHS and DVD 1
Songs
 28 (Intro)
 Guten Tag (Hello)
 Stunde des Siegers (Hour of victory)
 Onkelz 2000
 Terpentin (Turpentine)
 Nur die Besten sterben jung (Only the best ones die young)
 Fahrt zur Hölle (Go to hell)
 Schutzgeist der Scheiße (The protection spirit of crap)
 Dunkler Ort (Dark place)
 Kirche (Church)
 Hier sind die Onkelz (Here are the Onkelz)
 Medley
 Wilde Jungs (Wild boys)
 Heute trinken wir richtig (We're getting wasted tonight)
 So sind wir (That's how we are)
 Nie wieder (Never again)
13. Mexico
14. Erinnerungen (Memories)

Interviews
 Die 28 (The 28)
 Bandbus (Tour bus)
 20 Jahre Böhse Onkelz (20 years Böhse Onkelz)
 Backliner I
 Trimmi
 München
 Edmund
 rule23
 Suprasod
 Backliner II

DVD 2
 Flammen (Flames)
 Bin ich nur glücklich wenn es schmerzt (Am I only happy when it hurts)
 Keine ist wie du (No one is like you)
 Koma (Coma)
 Könige für einen Tag (Kings for a day)

Audio CD
 28 (Intro)
 Dunkler Ort
 Onkelz 2000
 Guten Tag
 Koma
 Terpentin
 Nur die Besten sterben jung
 Schutzgeist der Scheiße
 Keine ist wie du
 Bin ich nur glücklich wenn es schmerzt
 Stunde des Siegers
 Kirche
 Hier sind die Onkelz
 Medley
 Wilde Jungs
 So sind wir
 Heute trinken wir richtig
 Nie wieder
15. Mexico
16. Erinnerungen

Böhse Onkelz live albums
2001 video albums
Live video albums
2001 live albums